TSR3, or TSR3 Ribosome Maturation Factor, is a hypothetical human protein found on chromosome 16. Its protein is 312 amino acids long and its cDNA has 1214 base pairs. It was previously designated C16orf42.

Function

The function of C16orf42 is unknown. It is predicted to be a transmembrane protein, however the cellular or subcellular membrane in which is resides is as well unknown.

Homology

C16orf42 can also be found in many other organisms, including mammals, and certain fungi and plants. It is not found in bacteria. C16orf42 is highly conserved in many of its orthologs, especially its mammalian orthologs, as high as 95% identity in rhesus monkeys. It also has fairly high conservation in its more distant homologs, 53% identity in corn for example. It has one potential human paralog, the protein EGFL6.

Ortholog Analysis:

Expression

C16orf42 is not expressed ubiquitously in humans. It is most highly expressed in the ovary, but not expressed at all in the blood and very little in the brain. One microarray experiment suggested that malaria causes its expression in the blood, but further experimentation is needed to support this claim. Its expression in tissues tends to remain constant when the tissue is diseased. However, a brief analysis of its orthologs show inconsistencies in tissue expression. This could be due to a lack of research of this protein in other species.

Structure

The structure of C16orf42 is unknown. It is predicted to have multiple regions of alpha-helices, and a few short stretches of beta-strands. It contains a potential metal binding domain between amino acids 60–90. It has a predicted molecular weight of 33.6 kdal and an isoelectric point of 6.496000, making it slightly acidic. Compared to other human proteins, C16orf42 is high in the amino acids arginine and alanine, and low in the amino acid threonine.  A brief analysis of its strict orthologs show that they too are generally high in arginine and low in threonine as well as compared to the typical protein in their respective species.

References

External links

Further reading

NCBI Protein. "Hypothetical Protein LOC115939 [Homo sapiens]" June 26, 2007. https://www.ncbi.nlm.nih.gov/protein/47777330
NCBI Nucleotide. "Homo sapiens chromosome 16 open reading frame 42 (C16orf42), mRNA" June 26, 2007. https://www.ncbi.nlm.nih.gov/nuccore/48762675
NCBI BLink. "Hypothetical Protein LOC115939 [Homo sapiens]" https://www.ncbi.nlm.nih.gov/sutils/blink.cgi?pid=47777330&ordinalpos=1&itool=EntrezSystem2.PEntrez.Sequence.Sequence_SingleReportPanel.Sequence_ViewerPanel.Sequence_ViewerGenbankSidePanel.Sequence_DiscoveryDbLinks.DiscoveryDbLinks
NCBI BLAST. "NP_001001410 Hypothetical Protein LOC115939 [Homo sapiens]" http://blast.ncbi.nlm.nih.gov/Blast.cgi
UniGene EST Profile. "C16orf42: Chromosome 16 open reading frame 42, mRNA" https://www.ncbi.nlm.nih.gov/UniGene/ESTProfileViewer.cgi?uglist=Hs.134846
Biology Workbench. http://seqtool.sdsc.edu/CGI/BW.cgi#!]

Human proteins